The prix Louis-Guilloux is a French literary award established in 1983 by the Conseil général of the Côtes-d'Armor with the writers Yvon Le Men, Yannick Pelletier (specialist of Louis Guilloux).

The idea of this prie is "to perpetuate the literary ideals and values of the Breton writer". The prize is granted each year to a work in the French language which is characterised by "the humane qualities of generous thought, refusing all dualism and all sacrifice of individuality in favour of ideological abstractions".

Laureates

External links 
 Prix Louis Guilloux on Prix littéraire.net
 Le prix Louis-Guilloux 2016 pour “l'Ombre animale” de Makenzy Orcel on NouvelObs.com
 Makenzy Orcel, prix Louis Guilloux 2016 on Côte d'Armor.fr

French literary awards
Awards established in 1983
1983 establishments in France